The 2006 BYU Cougars football team represents Brigham Young University in the 2006 NCAA Division I FBS football season. The Cougars won the Mountain West Conference (MWC) championship outright with an 11–2 record (8–0 in the MWC), their first unbeaten conference play since 2001. This was also BYU's third season with at least a share of the MWC title (co-champions with CSU and Utah in 1999, and sole champions in 2001).  The Cougars play their home games at LaVell Edwards Stadium, named after its legendary coach, LaVell Edwards.

Pre-season
Among the returning starters were quarterback John Beck, running back Curtis Brown, linebacker Cameron Jenson and tight end Jonny Harline.

During the season
The Cougars started the season unranked in either the Coaches Poll or the AP Poll, and would not enter the polls until they had won their eighth game. They steadily rose in the rankings mainly on the strength of an offense that finished the regular season 5th in the nation in scoring and 4th in passing yards of 323.5 per game. The key to their offense was quarterback John Beck, who was one of the nation's top quarterbacks, running back Curtis Brown, and tight end Jonny Harline. They averaged a 465.5 yards and 36.8 points per game.

The Cougars played five bowl-bound teams during the season—Boston College, their second opponent from one of the six BCS conferences; Tulsa; TCU; the New Mexico; and their conference rivals, the Utah Utes. Notably, BYU defeated TCU (then ranked #15) by 31-17 putting an end to the Horned Frogs' 13-game winning streak.

Postseason awards and citations
John Beck
MWC Offensive Player of the Week for seven weeks
Mountain West Conference Offensive Player of the Year (unanimous)
Johnny Unitas Golden Arm Award Finalist
Davey O'Brien Award Semifinalist
Heisman candidate
Walter Camp National Offensive Player of the Week
First Team All-Mountain West Conference (unanimous)
Second Team All-America, The Sporting News
Honorable Mention All-America, CBSSportsline.com, Pro Football Weekly, College Football News

Jonny Harline
Mackey Award semifinalist
First Team All-America, The Sporting News, ESPN, College Football News, CBSSportsline.com, SI.com
Third Team All-America, Associated Press

Jake Kuresa
Second Team All-America, College Football News
Honorable Mention All-America, The Sporting News
First Team All-Mountain West Conference

Bronco Mendenhall
AFCA Region 5 Coach of the Year

Curtis Brown
First Team All-Mountain West Conference

Sete Aulai
Second Team All-Mountain West Conference

Cameron Jensen
First Team All-Mountain West Conference (unanimous)
Mountain West Conference Defensive Player of the Week

Quinn Gooch
Second Team All-Mountain West Conference

Bryan Kehl
Honorable Mention All-Mountain West Conference

Jared McLaughlin
Second Team All-Mountain West Conference

Nate Meikle
Second Team All-Mountain West Conference
Academic All-District
National Scholar-Athlete Candidate

Schedule

Rankings

Roster

Regular season

Arizona

Tulsa

Source:

Boston College

Source:

Utah State

Source:

TCU

Source:

San Diego State

Source:

UNLV

Source:

Air Force

Source:

Colorado State

Source:

Wyoming

Source:

New Mexico

Source:

Utah

Source: 
    
    
    
    
    
    
    
    
    
    

Announcer James Bates: "Five in a row won't happen." Referring to Utah winning the past four years in the rivalry series.

Las Vegas Bowl

Source: 
    
    
    
    
    
    
    

"Um, remind me again who's in the Mountain West Conference." - Mike Bellotti on BYU's undefeated conference record
"Collectively, no, they couldn't compete at the highest level in the Pac-10. They lost to Arizona this year. They wouldn't even be a midlevel Pac-10 team." - Bellotti on BYU as Pac-10 team
BYU first bowl win since 1996 season

References

BYU
BYU Cougars football seasons
Mountain West Conference football champion seasons
Las Vegas Bowl champion seasons
BYU Cougars football